George Francis Abercrombie,  (25 June,1896 – 25 September,1978) was a British physician who worked as a general practitioner (GP). In 1952, he co-founded the College of General Practitioners, later granted the royal prefix and renamed the Royal College of General Practitioners (RCGP). He became its president in 1967.

In 1950, Abercrombie was elected the first president of the section of general practice of the Royal Society of Medicine (RSM) and later became a fellow. He was also at this time, appointed honorary physician to King George VI.

Early life 
Abercrombie was born in 1896, the son of a solicitor. He enrolled in the Royal Navy at the onset of the World War I and despite being a medical student with only three months clinical experience, he assisted in numerous destroyers over a period of 10 months. He was affiliated to the London Division of the Royal Naval Reserve (RNVR), maintaining his interest in the navy throughout his life and eventually becoming surgeon captain.

Medicine
On returning from the war, Abercrombie completed a bachelor's degree at the University of Cambridge before qualifying in medicine from St Bartholomew's Medical College. He spent most of his medical career in general practice in Hampstead and had a particular interest in obstetrics, assisting in St Bartholomew's antenatal department.

He was president of the Hampstead medical society, chairman of the emergency bed service and a significant role in the King's Fund. In addition, he was co-editor of The British Encyclopaedia of General Practice. In 1950, he was appointed honorary physician to King George VI.

Section of general practice at Royal Society of Medicine 
Abercrombie was elected as the first president of the section of general practice, established 1950. He gave the presidential address on "The Occasional Obstetrician", and contributed significantly to its success. A number of his colleagues in the council, including John Hunt, Baron Hunt of Fawley, eventually became involved in the founding of the RCGP. The RSM later awarded him an honorary fellowship.

RCGP 
Initially apprehensive, following discussion with the executive of the RSM, Abercrombie at first turned down John Hunt's request for support in the formation of a college. He very soon changed his mind and became a member of the steering group, which founded the RCGP. He was appointed first chairman of the provisional foundation council on 19 November 1952 and his mother, Mrs G.K. Abercrombie, gave a significant donation. He subsequently became chairman of the full foundation council and of the first three councils of the college between 1953 and 1956. He was president of the college between 1959 and 1962. During that time he played a chief part in acquiring the Princess Gate building, the president's chain of office and the college's coat of arms. The RCGP's motto was initiated by Abercrombie.

Family and personal 
Abercrombie married Maria. His hobbies included mountain climbing and he was a member of the Alpine Club. He was a strong chess player and once won against world chess champion José Raúl Capablanca. As a member of the Sherlock Holmes Society, he published an article about Dr Watson. He retired in 1966.

Death and legacy 
Abercrombie died in 1978. The George Abercrombie Award is given for the most commendable literary work in general practice by a fellow, member or associate of the RCGP.

References 

British general practitioners
1896 births
Fellows of the Royal College of General Practitioners
1978 deaths
People educated at Charterhouse School
Alumni of Gonville and Caius College, Cambridge
English surgeons
Royal Navy officers of World War I
Royal Navy officers of World War II
Fellows of the Royal Society of Medicine
Royal Navy Medical Service officers
Royal Naval Volunteer Reserve personnel of World War I
Royal Naval Volunteer Reserve personnel of World War II
20th-century surgeons